Simon Marootian (1923 - 1980) was a political activist and a Superior Court Judge of Fresno County. He became the first Superior Court Judge of Fresno County of Armenian descent.

Life and career
Simon Marootian served as Supreme Court Judge of Fresno county from 1975 to 1980. He was also a local and statewide Democratic Party political activist. He was the chairman of the Fresno County Democratic Central Committee. In 1974 he became the Co-Chairman of Edmund Pat Brown campaign to become governor of California. He was also the chairman of the parish council of the St. Gregory Apostolic Church in Fowler, California.

He died in 1980 at the age of fifty-seven.

References

People from Fresno County, California
Armenian-American history
American political activists
1980 deaths
1923 births
American people of Armenian descent
Superior court judges in the United States
20th-century American judges
People from Fowler, California
Activists from California